Mäelooga is a village in Elva Parish, Valga County, in southeastern Estonia. It is located just northeast of Hellenurme, former administrative centre of the municipality. Mäelooga has a population of 48 (as of 1 January 2011).

References

Villages in Valga County